The Civic Democratic Party (ODS) leadership election of 2012 was a part of party's congress. Incumbent leader and Prime Minister Petr Nečas sought re-election. Nečas faced Ivan Fuksa who announced his candidacy only a day prior the election.

592 delegates were allowed to vote. Nečas received 351 votes and thus won the election. Fuksa received only 178 votes.

References

2012
2012 elections
2012 in the Czech Republic
Indirect elections
Elections in Brno
Civic Democratic Party leadership election